The 2013 Men's South American Hockey Championship was the fourth edition of the Men's South American Hockey Championship and the sixth if you count the South American Games. It was held from 26 January until 2 February 2013 in Santiago, Chile.

Argentina won the tournament for the fourth time in a row by defeating Chile 4–3 in the final.

Results
All times are local, CLST (UTC–3).

Pool

Classification

Fifth and sixth place

Third and fourth place

Final

Statistics

Final standings

Awards
The following awards were given at the conclusion of the tournament.

Goalscorers

See also
2013 Women's South American Hockey Championship

References

Men's South American Hockey Championship
South American Championship
International field hockey competitions hosted by Chile
South American Hockey Championship Men
Sports competitions in Santiago
2010s in Santiago, Chile
January 2013 sports events in South America
February 2013 sports events in South America